This is a list of singles that peaked in the top 10 of the Irish Singles Chart during 2020, as compiled by the Official Charts Company on behalf of the Irish Recorded Music Association.

Background
Eighty-nine songs charted in the top ten of the Irish Singles Chart in 2020. Of these, seventy-five songs reached their peak in the top-ten. Lewis Capaldi's "Before You Go" began the new decade as the number one single, spending its seventh consecutive week at the summit. "Yummy" by Justin Bieber became the first new top ten entry of the year, debuting at number eight on the 10 January.

Chart debuts
Forty-one artists achieved their first top 10 single in 2020, either as a lead or featured artist.

Top-ten singles
Key
 – indicates single's top 10 entry was also its chart debut

2019 peaks

2021 peaks

Entries by artist
The following table shows artists who achieved two or more top 10 entries in 2020, including songs that reached their peak in 2019. The figures include both main artists and featured artists. The culmulative number of weeks an artist's tracks spent in the top ten in 2020 is also shown.

Notes 

 "Roxanne" by Arizona Zervas spent 4 weeks in the top 10 in 2019.
 "My Oh My" by Camila Cabello featuring DaBaby spent 1 week in the top 10 in 2019.
 "All I Want For Christmas Is You" first entered the top-ten and reached its peak in 1994.
 "Last Christmas" first entered the top-ten and reached its peak in 1984.
 "Rockin' Around the Christmas Tree first entered the top-ten in 1963 and reached its peak in 2017.
 "Fairytale of New York" first entered the top-ten and reached its peak in 1987.

References

2020 in Irish music
Irish record charts
Ireland Singles
Ireland 2020